The east coast akalat or Gunning's robin (Sheppardia gunningi) is a small passerine bird which can be found in the east of Africa from Kenya to Mozambique, and is named after J. W. B. Gunning.

This species is a forest-dwelling insectivorous bird related to the small Old World flycatchers commonly known as chats; like these, it was formerly placed with the thrushes (Turdidae).

The east coast akalat is affected by habitat loss. Having turned out to be more common than previously believed, it is downlisted from Vulnerable to Near Threatened in the 2007 IUCN Red List.

References
 BirdLife International (2007a): [ 2006-2007 Red List status changes ]. Retrieved 2007-AUG-26.
 BirdLife International (2007b): East Coast Akalat - BirdLife Species Factsheet. Retrieved 2007-AUG-28.

east coast akalat
Birds of East Africa
east coast akalat